Soundtrack from Twin Peaks (also known as Music from Twin Peaks) is a soundtrack album by American composer Angelo Badalamenti. It was released on September 11, 1990, by Warner Bros. Records and is the official soundtrack to the television series Twin Peaks (1990–1991). Though mostly instrumental, three tracks feature vocals by Julee Cruise.

Background
The series' co-creator David Lynch produced the album alongside Badalamenti and wrote lyrics for several tracks, including the series' theme song "Falling".

Upon its release, Soundtrack from Twin Peaks placed in several international charts—including the top 10 in Norway, Sweden, Australia and the Netherlands—and "Twin Peaks Theme" received the award for Best Pop Instrumental Performance at 33rd Annual Grammy Awards.

Several tracks of the soundtrack were sampled numerous times, a famous example is "Laura Palmer's Theme", which was sampled in the Woodtick Mix of the song "Go" by Moby.

Track listing

Personnel
Credits adapted from the liner notes of Soundtrack from Twin Peaks.

Musicians
Angelo Badalamenti – piano, synthesizer, orchestration, arrangement, production
Julee Cruise – vocals 
Vinnie Bell – electric guitar
Eddie Daniels – flute, clarinet
Eddie Dixon – electric guitar
Kinny Landrum – synthesizer
Albert Regni – tenor saxophone, clarinet, flute
Grady Tate – drums

Technical
David Lynch – production, photography
Art Pohlemus – recording, mixing 
Jay Healy – mixing 
Howie Weinberg – mastering

Design
Tom Recchion – art direction, design
Kevin Laffey - coordination, A&R
Fredrik Nilsen – photography
Paula K. Shimatsu-U – photography
Marc Sirinsky – photography
Craig Sjodin – photography
Kimberly Wright – photography

Charts

Weekly charts

Year-end charts

Certifications

References

External links
 
 
 Written under the guidance of Angelo Badalamenti, explores the diverse sonic palette and delves deep into the world of Twin Peaks: Angelo Badalamenti's Soundtrack from Twin Peaks; Series: 33 1/3; Paperback: 176 pages; Publisher: Bloomsbury Academic (February 9, 2017); 

1990 soundtrack albums
Angelo Badalamenti soundtracks
Albums produced by Angelo Badalamenti
Albums produced by David Lynch
Music of Twin Peaks
Twin Peaks
Warner Records soundtracks